The year 1992 in archaeology involved some significant events.

Events
 Pointe-à-Callière Museum founded in Old Montreal, Quebec.

Excavations
 Tel Dan.
 Excavations begin at Kuşaklı (Sarissa).
 "Jules Verne" shipwrecks at Marseille.

Finds
 June
 Villa Mendo Roman Villa at Rio Alto, Portugal.
 Longyou Caves in China.
 28 September: Dover Bronze Age Boat, a substantially intact seagoing craft of 1575–1520 BCE, discovered by road construction workers on the south coast of England.
 16 November: Hoxne Hoard discovered by metal detectorist Eric Lawes in Suffolk, England.
 El Fuerte de Samaipata near Samaipata, Bolivia excavated by Dr. Albert Meyers of the University of Bonn.
 Stone tools 2.6 million years old are first found at Gona in the Afar Depression of Ethiopia.
 First fragments of Ardipithecus ramidus found.

Publications
 Donald B. Redford – Egypt, Canaan, and Israel in Ancient Times.
 Nils Ringstedt – Household Economy and Archaeology: some aspects of theory and applications.
 Lawrence Guy Straus – Iberia Before the Iberians: the Stone Age prehistory of Cantabrian Spain.
 Barrie Trinder (ed.) – The Blackwell Encyclopedia of Industrial Archaeology.

Births

Deaths
 24 January: Ignacio Bernal, Mexican archaeologist (b. 1910)
 22 February: Oscar Broneer, Swedish-American archaeologist of Ancient Greece (b. 1894)
 30 March: Manolis Andronikos, Greek archaeologist (b. 1919)
 21 April: Nigel Williams, English conservator (b. 1944)

References

Archaeology
Archaeology by year
Archaeology